Tilton Cutting is a  geological Site of Special Scientific Interest west of Tilton on the Hill in Leicestershire. It is a Geological Conservation Review site, and is owned and managed by the Leicestershire and Rutland Wildlife Trust as Tilton Railway Cutting.

This is the best site in the East Midlands which exposes the sequence of rocks in the Lower Jurassic around 180 million years ago. There are many fossils, including Tiltoniceras acutum, an age-diagnostic ammonite. The site has rich flora and diverse common birds.

There is access from the Tilton on the Hill to Oakham road.

References

Leicestershire and Rutland Wildlife Trust
Sites of Special Scientific Interest in Leicestershire
Geological Conservation Review sites